The Great Meteor Seamount, also called the Great Meteor Tablemount, is a guyot and the largest seamount in the North Atlantic with a volume of . It is one of the Seewarte Seamounts, rooted on a large terrace located south of the Azores Plateau. The crust underlying Great Meteor has an age of 85 million years, deduced from the magnetic anomaly 34 (An34) at this location.

Dredged basalts from the top of the eastern and southeastern flanks of the seamount have been K–Ar dated 10.7 ± 0.5 and 16.3 ± 0.4 million years old, respectively. The oldest sample has been 40Ar/39Ar dated at 17 ± 0.3 million years old.

Two small seamounts exist just southwest of Great Meteor and are encircled by the −3800 m bathymetric line.

The German research vessel Meteor discovered the tablemount between 1925 and 1927. It was given the name Great Meteor Bank, a designation still used in the official GEBCO gazetteer.

Formation
The New England hotspot formed the White Mountains 124 to 100 million years ago when the North American continent was directly overhead. As the continent drifted to the west, the hotspot gradually moved offshore. On a southeasterly course, the hotspot formed Bear Seamount, the oldest in the chain, about 100 to 103 million years ago. Over the course of millions of years, it continued creating the rest of the seamounts, eventually culminating in the Nashville Seamount about 83 million years ago. As the Atlantic Ocean continued to spread, the hotspot eventually traveled further east, forming the Great Meteor Seamount where it is found today. Radiometric dating of basalt from the Great Meteor Seamount has given ages of about 11 and 16 million years old, with the bulk of the seamount possibly having formed about 22 million years ago.

Ecology  
The unique ecological condition of the Great Meteor Seamount is shown by the many endemic copepod and nematode species.

References

Guyots
Seamounts of the Atlantic Ocean
Hotspot volcanoes
Miocene volcanoes
Former islands from the last glacial maximum